Michael Ryan (born 26 July 1943) is an Irish épée, foil and sabre fencer. He competed at the 1964 and 1968 Summer Olympics.

References

External links
 

1943 births
Living people
Irish male épée fencers
Olympic fencers of Ireland
Fencers at the 1964 Summer Olympics
Fencers at the 1968 Summer Olympics
People from Galway (city)
Sportspeople from County Galway
Irish male foil fencers
Irish male sabre fencers
20th-century Irish people